Steve Sims (born 2 July 1957 in Lincoln, England) is an English former football defender. He played about half of his professional career at Watford.

Sims started his career at Leicester City in 1975. After 3 seasons, he was transferred to Watford for £175,000 and was the player of the season for 1980/81. In 1984, he moved to Notts County and after 2 years with the club he returned to Watford for his second spell. After a single season he signed for Aston Villa and then played for Burton Albion.

Sims remained in the West Midlands after his time at Aston Villa and now works for Asda in Minworth.

References

External links
 Steve Sims – Watford FC – Football-Heroes.net
 Blind, Stupid and Desperate – Watford FC site – Tributes – Steve Sims

Living people
1957 births
English footballers
England under-21 international footballers
Association football defenders
Watford F.C. players
Leicester City F.C. players
Notts County F.C. players
Aston Villa F.C. players
Burton Albion F.C. players